Sir Alexander Wood Renton  (24 June 1861 – 17 June 1933) was a Scottish lawyer and British colonial judge. He served as the 21st Chief Justice of Ceylon from 1914 to 1918.

Biography
Renton was born in Fife, the son of Rev. John Renton and Janet Morrison (née Wemyss), a cousin of Sir James Wemyss Mackenzie, 5th Baronet. He was educated at the Glasgow Academy and the University of Edinburgh, where he took first class honours in the Legum Baccalaureus examination. He was called to the bar at Gray's Inn in 1885.

As a barrister in England, he did not acquire a large practice, but secured his reputation through his legal writings, including his 1896 book,  Law and Practice of Lunacy. He was an editor of the 13-volume Encyclopaedia of English Law (1897), English Reports, and the Law Journal, and contributed many legal articles to the Encyclopædia Britannica.

In 1901, Renton was sent to Mauritius as Procureur and Advocate-General, and served as a judge on the island. In 1905, he was appointed to the Supreme Court of Ceylon. He was promoted to Chief Justice of Ceylon on 22 August 1914 succeeding Alfred Lascelles and was Chief Justice until 1918. He was succeeded by Anton Bertram.

In 1918, Renton returned to England with the intention of retiring; however, the Colonial Office sent him on a special mission to Nigeria and the Gold Coast Colony.

In 1919, the Foreign Office sent him to Egypt, where he was vice-president of the Egyptian Riots Indemnities Commission. He was subsequently appointed chairman of the Ceylon Salaries Commission (1921), the Irish Compensation Commission (1923), the Irish Grants Committee (1926).

He was made a member of the Privy Council in 1923.

Personal life and honours

Renton was knighted in the 1915 Birthday Honours.  He was appointed a Knight Commander of the Order of St Michael and St George in the 1925 Birthday Honours and promoted a Knight Grand Cross of the same order in 1930.

In 1889, he married Elizabeth (née Jackson), with whom he had two daughters. He died in London, aged 71. In his obituary, The Times described him as a popular man: "Personally, he was much liked, and his Scottish humour was enhanced by the agreeable accent with which it was conveyed."

References

External links

 

Chief Justices of British Ceylon
Puisne Justices of the Supreme Court of Ceylon
19th-century Scottish lawyers
1861 births
1933 deaths
Scottish barristers
British Mauritius judges
People from Auchtermuchty
Knights Bachelor
Lawyers awarded knighthoods
Members of the Privy Council of the United Kingdom
Knights Grand Cross of the Order of St Michael and St George
People from colonial Nigeria
Gold Coast (British colony) people
People educated at the Glasgow Academy
Alumni of the University of Edinburgh
Members of Gray's Inn
Sri Lankan people of Scottish descent